The 1983 NCAA Division I women's basketball tournament began on March 18 and concluded on April 3 with USC winning the title. The tournament consisted of 36 teams. The Final Four was held in Norfolk, Virginia and consisted of USC, Louisiana Tech, Old Dominion, and Georgia. USC's Cheryl Miller was named the Most Outstanding Player of the tournament.

Notable events

Neither semifinal game in the final four turned out to be close. Defending national champion Louisiana Tech beat long time powerhouse Old Dominion by sixteen points, handing them their 30th consecutive victory. In the other semifinal, Southern California had an easier time, beating Georgia by 24 points. This set up the championship game between the only two top seeds to advance to the Final Four.

The two teams had met twice before in regular season, both coming away with a win, but in both cases, on the opponents home court. USC beat the Lady Techsters in Louisiana, 64–58, giving the La Tech team their only loss for the year. La Tech turned around and beat USC in Los Angeles by two points in January, one of only two losses suffered by the USC team all season.

The game came down to the final seconds. USC had a two-point lead with six seconds left in the game, and freshman star Cheryl Miller at the line for a one-and-one attempt. In the era before the three point shot, simply making the foul shot would virtually guarantee the win. But Miller missed the free throw, and the Techsters grabbed the rebound. The Lady Techsters ran up the court, where Kim Mulkey took the final shot, but it failed to go in, and USC won their first National Championship.

Records

In the National championship game, Jennifer White hit eight of nine free throw attempts to set a championship game record for free throw percentage.

In the same game, Cheryl Miller attempted 14 free throws, a national championship record.

The NCAA did not officially start keeping track of blocked shots in women's basketball until 1998 (it had begun doing so in the men's game in 1986). However, Anne Donovan of Old Dominion had twelve blocked shot in a regional game, two more than the official record of ten.

Qualifying teams – automatic
Thirty-six teams were selected to participate in the 1983 NCAA Tournament. Fourteen conferences were eligible for an automatic bid to the 1983 NCAA tournament. (Not all conference records are available for 1983)

Qualifying teams – at-large
Twenty-two additional teams were selected to complete the thirty-six invitations. (Not all conference records are available for 1983)
OR - Opening Round

Bids by conference
Twenty-two conferences earned an automatic bid. In sixteen cases, the automatic bid was the only representative from the conference. Thirteen at-large teams were selected from six of the conferences. In addition, three independent (not associated with an athletic conference) teams earned at-large bids.

Bids by state

The thirty-six teams represented twenty-four states, plus Washington, D.C.
California and Pennsylvania had the most teams with three each.  Twenty-six states did not have any teams receiving bids.

First round

In 1983, the field expanded from 32 to 36 teams. The teams were seeded, and assigned to four geographic regions, with seeds 1-9 in each region. The 8 and 9 seeds in each region played a play-in game, called the opening round (OR). In the opening round and Round 1, the higher seed was given the opportunity to host the first-round game, and all but one of the higher seeds hosted. Missouri was a 4 seed, but unable to host, so the game was played at 5 seed Auburn.

The following table lists the region, host school, venue and location. The opening round games are denoted with "OR".

Regionals and Final Four

The regionals, named for the general location, were held from March 24 to March 27 at these sites:
 East Regional  Recreation Building (Rec Hall), University Park, Pennsylvania (Host: Pennsylvania State University )
 Midwest Regional  Thomas Assembly Center, Ruston, Louisiana (Host: Louisiana Tech University)
 Mideast Regional  Athletic & Convocation Center, Notre Dame, Indiana (Host: University of Notre Dame)
 West Regional  Pauley Pavilion, Los Angeles, California (Host: University of California, Los Angeles)

Each regional winner advanced to the Final Four, held April 1 and 3 in Norfolk, Virginia, at the Norfolk Scope.

Brackets

East regional – Penn State University - University Park, PA (Rec Hall)

Midwest regional – Louisiana Tech - Ruston, LA (Thomas Assembly Center)

Mideast regional – Notre Dame - Notre Dame, IN Edmund P. Joyce Center

West regional – UCLA - Los Angeles, CA (Pauley Pavilion)

Final Four – Norfolk, Virginia

Record by  conference
Fifteen conferences had more than one bid,  or at least one win in NCAA Tournament play:

Eight conferences went 0-1: Big East, East Coast, Gateway, High Country, Ivy League, MAC, Mountain West Athletic, and SWAC

All-Tournament team

 Cheryl Miller, Southern California
 Paula McGee, Southern California
 Janice Lawrence, Louisiana Tech
 Jennifer White, Louisiana Tech
 Anne Donovan, Old Dominion

Game officials

 Jan Donahue (semifinal)
 Skip Gill (semifinal)
 Kit Robinson (semifinal, final)
 Pete Stewart (semifinal, final)

See also
 NCAA Women's Division I Basketball Championship
 1983 NCAA Division I men's basketball tournament

References

Tournament
NCAA Division I women's basketball tournament
NCAA Division I women's basketball tournament
NCAA Division I women's basketball tournament
NCAA Division I women's basketball tournament
Basketball competitions in Austin, Texas
Basketball competitions in Virginia
Sports in Norfolk, Virginia